Rupert Mayer (23 January 1876 – 1 November 1945) was a German Jesuit priest and a leading figure of the Catholic resistance to Nazism in Munich. In 1987, he was beatified by Pope John Paul II.

Early life
Mayer was born and grew up in Stuttgart, one of five siblings. He finished his secondary education in 1894 and studied philosophy and theology in Freiburg, Switzerland; Munich and Tübingen. He was, among other things, a member of A.V. Guestfalia Tübingen and K.D.St.V. Aenania München, two Studentenverbindungen that belong to the Cartellverband der katholischen deutschen Studentenverbindungen. In 1899, he was ordained a priest and served for a year as an assistant pastor in Spaichingen before joining the Society of Jesus in Feldkirch, Vorarlberg, Austria (then Austria-Hungary) in 1900. After his novitiate, he went to the Netherlands for further studies between 1906 and 1911, and then moved about Germany, Switzerland and the Netherlands preaching missions in many parishes. In 1912, he was transferred to Munich, where his ministry was largely to migrants who had come to the city seeking employment.

Army chaplain

From 1914, Mayer volunteered as a chaplain in the First World War. He was initially assigned to a camp hospital; but was later made a Field Captain and sent to the fronts in France, Poland and Romania as chaplain to a division of soldiers. His bravery was legendary and he was held in great esteem by the soldiers. When there was fighting at the front, Mayer would be found himself crawling along the ground from one soldier to the next talking to them, and administering the sacraments to them. In December 1915, Mayer was the first chaplain to win the Iron Cross for bravery in recognition of his work with the soldiers at the front. In December 1916, he lost his left leg after it was injured in a grenade attack. He returned to Munich to convalesce and was referred to as the Limping Priest.

Mayer worked managing a clerical retreat, as a preacher, and as of 1921 as a leader of the men's sodality in Munich. Mayer introduced Sunday Masses at the main railroad terminal for the convenience of travelers.

Protest against the Nazis
In January 1933, when Adolf Hitler became Chancellor of Germany, he began to close church-affiliated schools and started a campaign to discredit the religious orders in Germany.  Mayer spoke out against this persecution from the pulpit of St. Michael's in downtown Munich and because he was a powerful influence in the city, the Nazis could not tolerate such a force to oppose them.  On 16 May 1937, the Gestapo ordered Mayer to stop speaking in public which he obeyed, but he continued to preach in church.

Mayer spoke out against anti-Catholic baiting campaigns and fought against Nazi church policy. Since he believed that a Catholic could not be a National Socialist, conflict inevitably arose between him and the Nazis. He preached that Man must obey God more than men. His protests against the Nazis landed him several times in Landsberg prison. Mayer resolutely spoke out against the Nazi régime's evil in his lectures and sermons. On 5 June 1937, he was arrested and found himself in "protective custody" in Stadelheim Prison for six weeks. When he became the target of defamatory attacks on the part of the Nazis, his Jesuit superiors allowed him to return to the pulpit to defend himself against slanders that the Nazis made during his silence. He was re-arrested and served a sentence of five months. 

Mayer was arrested again 3 November 1939 and sent to Sachsenhausen concentration camp under the Kanzelparagraphen, a series of 19th-century laws that forbade the clergy to make political statements. He was released from there on the condition of a broad ban on preaching. The sixty-three-year old priest developed heart problems, From late 1944, he was interned in Ettal Monastery, mainly because the Nazis were afraid that he would die in the concentration camp, and thus become a martyr. He remained there until liberated by the US forces in May 1945.

A United States officer returned him to Munich, where he resumed his duties at St. Michael's Church. Mayer died on his feet on 1 November 1945 of a stroke, while he was celebrating 8:00 AM Mass, on the feast of All Saints' Day in St. Michael's in Munich.  Accompanied by thousands of mourners, Mayer was first buried at the Jesuitenfriedhof in Pullach. Due to the steady stream of pilgrims, his remains were moved to Munich in 1948 and were reburied in the Unterkirche of the Bürgersaalkirche.

Veneration

Since his death in 1945, Mayer's followers called for his beatification. In 1950, Cardinal Michael von Faulhaber opened the information process in the Archdiocese of Munich and Freising regarding the call to sanctity and virtues. In 1951, Jesuit provincial Otto Faller completed and formally forwarded the beatification information to Rome.

In 1956, Pope Pius XII, who had personally known Rupert Mayer during his time as nuncio in Munich, awarded him the title Servant of God. Under Pope John XXIII, the beatification process was initiated, the results of which were formally accepted by Pope Paul VI in 1971. Under Pope John Paul II, the decree of 'heroic virtue' was issued in 1983. Mayer was beatified by Pope John Paul II on 3 May 1987 in Munich. His feast day is 3 November.

The chapel of the Fordham University Lincoln Center Campus is named in honor of Rupert Mayer S.J.

Legacy

In Bavaria, numerous streets are named after Father Mayer. In 1954, the Cartell Rupert Mayer (CRM) was founded. It was a further development of the first Christliche Loge (CL) founded in Munich in 1946. The mediaeval Dombauhütten Logen may be considered its forerunner. In Pullach, Bavaria, a public school, a Realschule  and a Gymnasium  bear his name.

In Cebu City, Philippines, Sacred Heart School – Ateneo de Cebu, has a section named after him. Another Jesuit school in the Philippines, Xavier University – Ateneo de Cagayan, has a high school section that bears his name. Regis Jesuit High School in Aurora, Colorado dedicated the chapel to him. In 2006 Fordham University dedicated a chapel in his name at their Lincoln Center campus in Manhattan, New York. St Rupert Mayer has a missionary school named after him in Zimbabwe. Another school in the Philippines, Ateneo de Davao University Senior High School, has a senior high school section named after him.

In 1988 he was pictured on a German postage stamp with Edith Stein in honor of their beatifications.

In 2014 a movie was made of his life, called "Father Rupert Mayer" and starring Oliver Gruber. The movie can be seen on YouTube.

Prayer of Rupert Mayer
The following text come from the song produced by Bukas Palad Music Ministry:
Lord, what You will let it be so
Where You will there we will go
What is Your will help us to know

Lord, when You will the time is right
In You there's joy in strife
For Your will I'll give my life

To ease Your burden brings no pain
To forego all for You is gain
As long as I in You remain

REFRAIN:
Because You will it, it is best
Because You will it, we are blest
Till in Your hands our hearts find rest
Till in Your hands our hearts find rest

References

External links
Biography
Cartell Rupert Mayer
German stamp honouring Edith Stein and Rupert Mayer on the occasion of their beatification

1876 births
1945 deaths
20th-century German Jesuits
German beatified people
World War I chaplains
20th-century venerated Christians
German military chaplains
Roman Catholics in the German Resistance
Catholic saints and blesseds of the Nazi era
Clergy from Stuttgart
German amputees
Recipients of the Iron Cross (1914), 1st class
People from the Kingdom of Württemberg
Beatifications by Pope John Paul II
Venerated Catholics by Pope John Paul II
Sachsenhausen concentration camp prisoners